New Constellation is the sixth studio album by American alternative rock band Toad the Wet Sprocket, released October 15, 2013, through Abe's Records. It is available on CD, vinyl and as a digital download. web Financed with more than $250,000 from approximately 6,300 contributors on the crowdfunding website Kickstarter, it is the first full-length studio release since the band's 1997 album Coil.

Background and recording
Following the band's official breakup in 1998 the members played numerous shows and released several albums, including a compilation of hits and fan favorites in 1999 (P.S. (A Toad Retrospective)), a live album in 2004 (Welcome Home: Live at the Arlington Theatre, Santa Barbara 1992) and a greatest hits album in 2011 (All You Want). The band recorded two new studio tracks for P.S. (A Toad Retrospective) and a Christmas song originally performed by Sam Phillips titled "It Doesn't Feel Like Christmas" in 2011.

In an interview with Yahoo Music published on July 29, 2014, singer/guitarist Glen Phillips described the one-off shows and the time period around them:
"Three to four years ago, it started feeling like fun again. We started enjoying each other’s company and remembered what made it good and we kind of got out of our own inter-personal dramas a little bit. At some point, it felt like it would be a good idea to make another record, to actually enjoy each other’s company and make some good art again."

On March 22, 2013, it was announced on the band's Facebook page that the recording process of their new album was finished. The album was produced, engineered and mixed by Mikal Blue at Revolver Studios in Thousand Oaks, California

Funding
To fund the album, the band decided to use the crowdfunding source Kickstarter with hopes of raising $50,000 within a few months. The goal was reached in just 20 hours and eventually surpassed $250,000.

Release
On June 29, 2013, the full album (known as the Advance Digital Download Deluxe Edition) was made available as a download to contributors of the Kickstarter campaign. The band put together several bundles of the release based on the amount pledged. Some packages included signed copies, limited editions and even personal appearances.

The physical and retail digital release came October 15, 2013, through the band's independent record label, Abe's Records.

Critical reception

New Constellation received mostly positive feedback from music critics. Michael Perone of WhatCulture! describes the album's tracks as having "a sunny pop sheen reminiscent of their home state’s weather," and that "it’s difficult to get any of the melodies out of your head." Fred Thomas of AllMusic writes, "Older, wiser, and with a newfound hopefulness that wasn't there in their younger days, Toad deliver an uncluttered and thoughtful next step of their ongoing songcraft."

Track listing

Charts
New Constellation debuted at No. 97 on the Billboard 200 chart, selling 4,000 copies in its first week of release.

Personnel
Credits adapted from AllMusic

Toad the Wet Sprocket
Dean Dinning – bass, engineer, acoustic guitar, keyboards, backing vocals
Randy Guss – drums, percussion
Todd Nichols – engineer, lead guitar, backing vocals
Glen Phillips – lead vocals, engineer, rhythm guitar, keyboards, ukulele

Other musicians
Mikal Blue – keyboards, ukulele
Zac Rae – keyboards
Billy Hawn – percussion
Greg Leisz – lap steel guitar, pedal steel guitar

Technical personnel
Andrew Williams – string arrangements
Mikal Blue – engineer, mixing, production
Jon Marinos – engineer
Eric Boulanger – mastering
Doug Sax – mastering
Kii Arens – design
Ben Ciccati – illustrations
Rob Shanahan – photography

References

External links 
 Official website

2013 albums
Kickstarter-funded albums
Self-released albums
Toad the Wet Sprocket albums
Albums produced by Mikal Blue
Crowdfunded albums